The 2008 Women's Hockey Champions Trophy was the 16th edition of the Hockey Champions Trophy for women. It was held between 17 and 25 May 2008 in Mönchengladbach, Germany.

Argentina won the tournament after 7 years for the second time after defeating Germany 6–2 in the final.

Teams
Teams participating as announced by International Hockey Federation (FIH):

 (Defending champions and champions of 2006 World Cup)
 (Host nation and champions of 2004 Summer Olympics)
 (Second in 2006 World Cup)
 (Third in 2006 World Cup)
 (Fifth in 2006 World Cup)
 (Host of 2008 Summer Olympics)

Squads

Head coach: Gabriel Minadeo

Head coach: Frank Murray

Head coach: Kim Chang-back

Head coach: Michael Behrmann

Head coach: Yoo Seung-jin

Head coach: Marc Lammers

Umpires
Below are the 8 umpires appointed by the International Hockey Federation:

Frances Block (ENG)
Caroline Brunekreef (NED)
Marelize de Klerk (RSA)
Christiane Hippler (GER)
Anne McRae (SCO)
Miao Lin (CHN)
Chieko Soma (JPN)
Gina Spitaleri (ITA)

Results
All times are Central European Summer Time (UTC+02:00)

Pool

Classification

Fifth and sixth place

Third and fourth place

Final

Awards

Statistics

Final standings

Goalscorers

References

External links
Official FIH website

2008
2008 in women's field hockey
International women's field hockey competitions hosted by Germany
field hockey
Sport in Mönchengladbach
May 2008 sports events in Europe
21st century in Mönchengladbach